Tentax vetus is a moth of the family Erebidae first described by Michael Fibiger in 2011. It is found in south-eastern and central eastern India.

The wingspan is 11.5–13 mm. The forewings are grey brown, with grey-brown subterminal and terminal areas, including the fringes. There is a blackish-grey quadrangular patch at the upper area, with a black dot at the inner, lower patch. The costa is basally black, subapically with small black dots. The crosslines are mostly well defined and reddish brown. The terminal line is only indicated by black interveinal dots. The hindwings are grey with an indistinct discal spot. The underside of the forewings is unicolorous grey brown and the underside of the hindwings is grey with a discal spot.

References

Micronoctuini
Taxa named by Michael Fibiger
Moths described in 2011